The 1991 Big East Conference baseball tournament was held at Muzzy Field in Bristol, Connecticut. This was the seventh annual Big East Conference baseball tournament. The second seeded  won their second tournament championship and claimed the Big East Conference's automatic bid to the 1991 NCAA Division I baseball tournament.

Format and seeding 
The Big East baseball tournament was a 4 team double elimination tournament in 1991. The top four teams were seeded one through four based on conference winning percentage only.

Bracket

Jack Kaiser Award 
Mike Neill was the winner of the 1991 Jack Kaiser Award. Neill was a center fielder for Villanova.

References 

Tournament
Big East Conference Baseball Tournament
Big East Conference baseball tournament
Big East Conference baseball tournament
College baseball tournaments in Connecticut
Bristol, Connecticut
Sports competitions in Hartford County, Connecticut]